Luka Klasinc (born 7 March 1973) is a Slovenian figure skater. He competed in the men's singles event at the 1992 Winter Olympics, finishing in 26th place.

In 2021, Klasinc was charged with bank fraud and identity theft after attempting to defraud the U.S. Small Business Administration of over $1.5 million.

References

1973 births
Living people
Slovenian male single skaters
Olympic figure skaters of Slovenia
Figure skaters at the 1992 Winter Olympics
Sportspeople from Ljubljana
20th-century Slovenian people